Sympistis chorda is a moth of the family Noctuidae first described by Augustus Radcliffe Grote in 1880. It is found in North America from British Columbia, south to California. It was formerly known as Oncocnemis chorda, but was transferred to the genus Sympistis in 2008.

The wingspan is about 32 mm.

Subspecies
The following subspecies are recognised:
Sympistis chorda chorda
Sympistis chorda extremis

References

chorda
Moths of North America
Fauna of California
Moths described in 1880